Karluk (Kal’uq or Kal’ut in Alutiiq) is a census-designated place (CDP) in Kodiak Borough, Kodiak Island, Alaska, United States. The population was 37 at the 2010 census, up from 27 in 2000.

Geography

Karluk is located at  (57.578081, -154.362557)

Demographics

Karluk first appeared on the 1880 U.S. Census as an unincorporated village with 302 residents, including an Inuit majority of 277, with 24 "Creole" (Mixed Russian & Native) and 1 White. In 1890, it reported 1,123 residents, making it the 3rd largest community in Alaska, narrowly behind Juneau with 1,253 and the then-capital of Sitka with 1,190. A plurality being Asian, with 542 (the largest community of Asians), 391 Whites, 167 Native Alaskans, 20 Creoles and 3 not classified. It has continued to report in every successive census to date. It was erroneously reported on the 1940 census as "Karluck." In 1980, it was made a census-designated place (CDP).

As of the census of 2000, there were 27 people, 9 households, and 7 families residing in the CDP. The population density was 0.5 people per square mile (0.2/km2). There were 24 housing units at an average density of 0.4/sq mi (0.2/km2). The racial makeup of the CDP was 0.00% White, 96.30% Native American and 3.70% Asian.

There were 9 households, out of which 44.4% had children under the age of 18 living with them, 33.3% were married couples living together, 33.3% had a female householder with no husband present, and 22.2% were non-families. 22.2% of all households were made up of individuals, and none had someone living alone who was 65 years of age or older. The average household size was 3.00 and the average family size was 3.43.

In the CDP, the population was spread out, with 37.0% under the age of 18, 7.4% from 18 to 24, 33.3% from 25 to 44, 14.8% from 45 to 64, and 7.4% who were 65 years of age or older. The median age was 30 years. For every 100 females, there were 125.0 males. For every 100 females age 18 and over, there were 112.5 males.

The median income for a household in the CDP was $19,167, and the median income for a family was $19,167. Males had a median income of $0 versus $20,000 for females. The per capita income for the CDP was $13,736. There were no families and none of the population living below the poverty line, including no under eighteens and none of those over 64.

History

In 1787 Evstratii Delarov, manager of the Russian Shelikhov-Golikov Company established an outpost at Karluk.

On March 17, 1945, the village participated in the rescue of seven (7) U.S. Navy aviators who ditched their PB1 Ventura patrol bomber offshore. U.S. Navy Archives

In 2021, the Ascension of Our Lord Chapel was relocated from a bluff overlooking the river to prevent its destruction.

Education
The Karluk School, a K-12 rural school, is operated by the Kodiak Island Borough School District.

References

External links
 Ascension of Our Lord Chapel, Karluk

Census-designated places in Alaska
Census-designated places in Kodiak Island Borough, Alaska
Populated coastal places in Alaska on the Pacific Ocean
Road-inaccessible communities of Alaska